The Liga Nacional de Baloncesto (LNB) is the top men's professional basketball league in the Dominican Republic. Established in 2005, six teams compete annually between September and October.

History 
The league was founded on September 6, 2004 at the Hotel Lina in Santo Domingo as the Liga Dominicana de Baloncesto (Dominican Basketball League), also known as LIDOBA; the founders were a group of investors and former basketball players, supported by the Dominican Basketball Federation. Before the creation of a national league, basketball was practiced at regional and local level. 

The teams that participated in the first edition in 2005 were:

Cañeros de La Romana
Cocolos de San Pedro de Macorís
Constituyentes de San Cristóbal
Indios de San Francisco de Macorís
Marineros de Puerto Plata
Metros de Santiago
Panteras del Distrito Nacional
Reales de La Vega

The first game was played on July 1, 2005 at the Palacio de los Deportes Virgilio Travieso Soto between Panteras del Distrito Nacional and Indios de San Francisco de Macorís: Panteras won, 79–63. The first league champions were Reales de La Vega, that won the title after winning the best-of-7 championship series against Panteras, 4–2.

In 2009, the league was cancelled due to financial difficulties. On May 19, 2010 the league announced its return under a new branding and name, Liga Nacional de Baloncesto (National Basketball League).

From 2005 to 2017, the league had 8 teams participating every season. In 2018, Huracanes del Atlántico folded, and the league was played by 7 teams (3 in the North conference, and 4 in the Southeast conference). In 2019, Titanes del Distrito Nacional also folded, bringing the team number to 6.

Teams

Current teams 
Teams participating in the 2021-22 season

 Cañeros del Este
 Huracanes del Atlántico
 Indios de San Francisco de Macorís
 Leones de Santo Domingo
 Metros de Santiago
 Reales de La Vega
 Soles de Santo Domingo Este
Titanes del Licey

Format

Regular season 
In the first season in 2005, all 8 teams competed in a round-robin tournament, where each team had to play against every other team. In 2006 two conferences were introduced: the Circuito Norte (North) and Circuito Sur (South), of 4 teams each. In 2010, with the league changing name to Liga Nacional de Baloncesto, the Sur conference was renamed Sureste (Southeast). In 2018, with the folding of Huracanes del Atlántico, the North conference included only 3 teams. In 2019 the team number was reduced to 6, and the league reintroduced the round-robin tournament, eliminating the conference system.

Playoffs 
In 2005, the first 4 teams at the end of the regular season qualified for the playoffs. With the introduction of two conferences (Circuitos) in 2006, the first 3 teams of each conference qualified for the playoffs. In 2011 this was changed, as only the first 2 teams qualified for the playoffs, thus eliminating the first round of the playoffs. The first two teams of each conference faced each other in the playoffs semifinals, and the championship game was played between the winners of the semifinal series. In 2016, the first 3 teams of each conference qualified for a further postseason round robin tournament, the winners of which qualified for the championship game. This was eliminated in 2018, with the folding of Huracanes del Atlántico, and the league resumed the original playoff format, reintroducing the semifinals.

List of champions

Championships

Awards

Most Valuable Player

Finals MVP

Statistical leaders

Scoring

Rebounds

Assists

Steals

Blocks

Individual records

Game 

 Most points in a game
54 by Adris De León, Metros de Santiago (vs. Huracanes del Atlántico) on August 11, 2016
 Most rebounds in a game
27 by Jack Michael Martínez, Cocolos de San Pedro de Macorís (vs. Cañeros de La Romana) on August 31, 2007
 Most assists in a game
15 by Richard Ortega, Indios de San Francisco de Macorís (vs. Cañeros de La Romana) on August 5, 2008
15 by Juan Coronado, Reales de La Vega (vs. Indios de San Francisco de Macorís) on July 9, 2017
 Most blocks in a game
11 by Scott VanderMeer, Leones de Santo Domingo (vs. Titanes del Distrito Nacional) on July 15, 2011
 Most 3-point field goals made in a game
11 by Courtney Nelson, Huracanes del Atlántico (vs. Metros de Santiago) on September 3, 2011 (11/20)
11 by Adris De León, Metros de Santiago (vs. Huracanes del Atlántico) on August 11, 2016 (11/23)

Season 
 Most points in a season
523 by Gerardo Suero, Indios de San Francisco de Macorís in 2017
 Most rebounds in a season
261 by Alexis Montas, Cañeros del Este in 2011
 Most assists in a season
159 by Richard Ortega, Indios de San Francisco de Macorís in 2008
 Most steals in a season
67 by Carlos Wheeler, Panteras del Distrito Nacional in 2005
 Most blocks in a season
76 by Edward Santana, Cañeros de La Romana in 2005

References

External links
 Official website
 Dominican league on Latinbasket.com 
 @LNBrd

Basketball in the Dominican Republic
Dom